The Emancipator (1833–1850) was an American abolitionist newspaper, at first published in New York City and later in Boston. It was founded as the official newspaper of the American Anti-Slavery Society (AASS). From 1840 to 1850 it was published by the Liberty Party; the publication changed names several times as it merged with other abolitionist newspapers in Boston.

Contributors to the paper included Lewis Tappan (of the Amistad case), James McCune Smith (who also co-edited The Colored American), Joseph Cammett Lovejoy, Samuel Edmund Sewall, Henry Brewster Stanton, Horace Edwin Smith, William Ellery Channing, and William Stevens Robinson.

History 
The Emancipator was founded in March 1833 in New York City by Arthur Tappan, a wealthy abolitionist and president of the American Anti-Slavery Society. The March 1833 publication marked the beginning of the abolitionist movement in New York state. The Emancipator's first editor was Charles Wheeler Denison. 

African-American sales agents selected to represent the new publication included:
 David Ruggles, New York City, who was the general agent
 John D. Closson, Newark, New Jersey
 Thomas Van Rensslear, Princeton, New Jersey
 Abraham Doras Shadd, Pennsylvania
 John Carlisle, Pennsylvania

On October 25, 1835, in a nationally publicized spectacle, a Tuscaloosa County, Alabama, grand jury issued a true bill against Robert G. Williams, agent and publisher of The Emancipator, for allegedly "circulating seditious pamphlets in Alabama"  "tending to excite our slave population to insurrection and murder." On November 14, 1835, the Alabama Governor, John Gayle demanded that New York Governor William Learned Marcy extradite Williams, "a fugitive," to stand trial. Marcy refused.

From 1836 to 1840, the editor was Theodore Dwight Weld. After Weld left this position, Joshua Leavitt succeeded him as editor.

In 1840, the American and Foreign Anti-Slavery Society splintered from the American Anti-Slavery Society. The Emancipator then became Leavitt's personal publication and a leading journal of the Liberty Party, with Leavitt continuing as the editor of the newspaper until 1848. 

The newspaper underwent several name changes between 1842 and 1848 as it slowly merged with other abolitionist newspapers located in Boston. Throughout this period, the publication was a continual exponent of abolitionism. In January 1842, the publication merged with The Free American, the official newspaper of the Massachusetts Abolition Society, and was published weekly as The Emancipator and Free American. Leavitt (New York) and Elizur Wright (Boston) served as co-editors until March 1844, when Wright left and the journal moved its headquarters to Boston.

The publication (at that point known as the Emancipator & Republican) published its final issue on December 26, 1850.

Timelines

Editors

Publication name

Publishers

Gallery

Extant holdings, re-prints, and digital facsimiles 
 The Emancipator (–1834)
 

 The Emancipator, and Journal of Public Morals (1834–1835)
 The Historical Society of Wisconsin (microfilm 1966); 
 Gale (online); 

 The Emancipator (1833–1848)
 Gale (online); 

 The Emancipator (1835–1840)
 Filmed from the Schomberg Collection (1967 microfilm); 

 The Emancipator (1845–1848)
 NewsBank (online); 
 Gale (online); 

 Emancipator and Free American (1842–1844)
 Gale (online); 
 (microform); 

 Emancipator and Weekly Chronicle (1844–1845)
 Filmed from the New York Public Library (microfilm); 

 Emancipator and Free Soil Press
 NewsBank (online); 
 Gale (online); 

 Emancipator & Republican
 Microfilm; 
 Gale (online); 
 Serials Solutions (online);

Further reading 
 Vaughn, Stephen L. (ed.). Encyclopedia of American Journalism. Routledge (2009) pps. 4–5 ("Abolitionist Press: Newspaper Chronology");  (digital format)

See also
 Abolitionist publications
 New York Manumission Society
 American Anti-Slavery Society
 American and Foreign Anti-Slavery Society
 Boston Female Anti-Slavery Society
 Massachusetts Anti-Slavery Society
 Boston Vigilance Committee
 Fall River Female Anti Slavery Society
 Pennsylvania Anti-Slavery Society
 Philadelphia Female Anti-Slavery Society
 Vigilant Association of Philadelphia
 Ohio Anti-Slavery Society

References

Notes

Citations 

1833 establishments in the United States
1850 disestablishments in the United States
Abolitionist newspapers published in the United States
Publications established in 1833
Publications disestablished in 1850
Defunct newspapers published in Massachusetts
Defunct newspapers published in New York City